Doughnuts and Society is a 1936 American comedy film directed by Lewis D. Collins and written by Karen DeWolf, Robert St. Claire, Wallace MacDonald, Matt Brooks and Gertrude Orr. The film stars Louise Fazenda, Maude Eburne, Ann Rutherford, Edward Nugent, Hedda Hopper and Franklin Pangborn. The film was released on March 27, 1936, by Republic Pictures.

Plot
Belle Dugan and Kate Flanagan are partners in a doughnut business. When Belle gets $50,000 to sell her mine to a mining company for potential gold, she is brought into society and wealth with her daughter Joan. She leaves Kate behind with her son Jerry behind at the doughnut business. Although they left on bad terms, Belle invites Kate and Jerry to a party at their new mansion, all while Kate wears uncomfortable shoes. When she sits to take them off, a dog snatches them, and she embarrasses herself in front of everyone at the party. Belle kicks her out, and Joan and Jerry leave on bad terms, in defense of their mothers. That same night, Jerry has a brilliant money-making idea: a parking garage.

They make a cake as a diorama and they start their garage business, as well as get into society and wealth just like Belle and Joan. This time, however, Kate has the party and invites Belle and Joan to HER mansion. Again, they leave on bad terms, as well as Joan and Jerry. Soon, Kate and Jerry sell the company because they were sabotaged by a businessman whose offer to buy out the business was rejected. As a result, they were forced to sell the company to another businessman. Now they are out of wealth and back to the doughnuts when all of a sudden, just before Joan is to marry a Frenchman, the same woman that came and gave Belle the $50,000 for her mine comes and tells her they didn't find any gold, just water. Now, Joan and Jerry get married and Belle and Kate are back where they started, at the doughnut business!

Cast
Louise Fazenda as Kate Flannagan
Maude Eburne as Belle Dugan
Ann Rutherford as Joan Dugan
Edward Nugent as Jerry Flannagan 
Hedda Hopper as Mrs. Murray Hill
Franklin Pangborn as Benson
Rafael Storm as Ivan Petroff 
Harold Minjir as Hoyt
Olaf Hytten as Wellington
Robert Light as Bill
Isabelle Keith as Miss Bradley 
Smiley Burnette as Mover #2

References

External links

1936 films
1930s English-language films
American comedy films
1936 comedy films
Republic Pictures films
Films directed by Lewis D. Collins
American black-and-white films
Films produced by Nat Levine
1930s American films